Sarath Kumar, better known by his stage name Appani Sarath (born 28 December 1992), is an Indian actor who appears in Malayalam and Tamil films.

Career
Sarath came into limelight after portraying the character of Appani Ravi in Angamaly Diaries directed by Lijo Jose Pellissery, which gained him instant popularity. He later acted in Velipadinte Pusthakam directed by Lal Jose playing the role of Franklin, who appears in the famous Jimikki Kammal song. He had important roles in Pokkiri Simon and Sachin.

Sarath has also done few Tamil films, with a brief role in the 2018 Mani Ratnam movie; Chekka Chivantha Vaanam and Sandakozhi 2 with Vishal-a sequel to the 2005 movie Sandakozhi.

He played the famous notorious serial killer and criminal Auto Shankar in the ZEE5 series Auto Shankar.

Filmography

Film

Web series

Awards

References

External links
 

Indian male film actors
Living people
Male actors from Thiruvananthapuram
Male actors in Tamil cinema
Male actors in Malayalam cinema
Indian male stage actors
1992 births